State Highway 36 (SH-36) is a  east-west state highway located in the southeast part of the U.S. state of Idaho. SH-36 runs from Interstate 15 (I-15) near Malad City to U.S. Route 89 (US-89) near Montpelier. The highway is maintained by the Idaho Transportation Department.

Route description

SH-36 begins at a diamond interchange with I-15. As Deep Creek Road, the highway travels east before turning southeast, passing through the forest and just west of Old Baldy Peak before entering the town of Weston. There, SH-36 turns north, entering Dayton before turning east. Crossing the Bear River, the highway continues into the city of Preston, running concurrently with US-91 due north along State Street before turning northeast along a roadway with SH-34. After crossing the Bear River again, SH-36 continues northeast, passing through the community of Mink Creek before passing through fields and forests. SH-36 passes through Liberty before ending in the town of Ovid just west of Montpelier.

Major intersections

See also

 List of state highways in Idaho
 List of highways numbered 36

References

External links

036
Transportation in Oneida County, Idaho
Transportation in Franklin County, Idaho
Transportation in Bear Lake County, Idaho